In Greek mythology, the name Evippus or Euippos  (meaning "having good horses") may refer to:

Evippus, a Pleuronian prince as the son of King Thestius and Eurythemis, daughter of Cleoboea. He was the brother of Althaea, Leda, Hypermnestra, Iphiclus, Plexippus and Eurypylus. Evippus might have been killed by his nephew Meleager during the war of the Curetes and the Calydonians.
Evippus, a Lycian who was killed by Patroclus in the Trojan War.
Evippus, a son of Megareus and Iphinoe, brother of Timalcus and Euaechme. He was killed by the Cithaeronian lion.
Evippus, an Arcadian hero. On the wedding day of Adrastus' daughters, his shield fell off the highest summit of the temple of Athena, which was a sign of bad luck in the future.

Notes

References 

 Homer, The Iliad with an English Translation by A.T. Murray, Ph.D. in two volumes. Cambridge, MA., Harvard University Press; London, William Heinemann, Ltd. 1924. . Online version at the Perseus Digital Library.
 Homer, Homeri Opera in five volumes. Oxford, Oxford University Press. 1920. . Greek text available at the Perseus Digital Library.
 Pausanias, Description of Greece with an English Translation by W.H.S. Jones, Litt.D., and H.A. Ormerod, M.A., in 4 Volumes. Cambridge, MA, Harvard University Press; London, William Heinemann Ltd. 1918. . Online version at the Perseus Digital Library
 Pausanias, Graeciae Descriptio. 3 vols. Leipzig, Teubner. 1903.  Greek text available at the Perseus Digital Library.
 Pseudo-Apollodorus, The Library with an English Translation by Sir James George Frazer, F.B.A., F.R.S. in 2 Volumes, Cambridge, MA, Harvard University Press; London, William Heinemann Ltd. 1921. . Online version at the Perseus Digital Library. Greek text available from the same website.
 Publius Papinius Statius, The Thebaid translated by John Henry Mozley. Loeb Classical Library Volumes. Cambridge, MA, Harvard University Press; London, William Heinemann Ltd. 1928. Online version at the Topos Text Project.
 Publius Papinius Statius, The Thebaid. Vol I-II. John Henry Mozley. London: William Heinemann; New York: G.P. Putnam's Sons. 1928. Latin text available at the Perseus Digital Library.

Princes in Greek mythology
People of the Trojan War
Aetolian characters in Greek mythology
Megarian characters in Greek mythology